From Dictatorship to Democracy, A Conceptual Framework for Liberation is a book-length essay on the generic problem of how to destroy a dictatorship and to prevent the rise of a new one. The book was written in 1993 by Gene Sharp (1928-2018), a professor of political science at the University of Massachusetts. The book has been published in many countries worldwide and translated into more than 30 languages. Editions in many languages are also published by the Albert Einstein Institution of Boston, Massachusetts.  its current primary English-language edition is the Fourth United States Edition, published in May 2010.

The book has been circulated worldwide and cited repeatedly as influencing movements such as the Arab Spring of 2010–2012.

Origin

From Dictatorship to Democracy (FDTD) was written in 1993 at the request of a prominent exiled Burmese democrat, Tin Maung Win, who was then editor of Khit Pyaing (The New Era Journal), in
Bangkok, Thailand. The book took several months to write as the author drew upon several decades of experience in scholarship on nonviolent action.
FDTD was first published in 1993 as installments in Burmese and English in Khit Pyaing. In 1994, it was issued as a booklet in both English and Burmese. Since that time, there have been several additional English-language editions and translations into more than 30 additional languages.

Topics covered
From Dictatorship to Democracy contains a preface and ten sections.  Its first appendix includes 198 Methods Of Nonviolent Action that were taken from Gene Sharp's The Politics of Nonviolent Action (1973), Part Two, The Methods of Nonviolent Action. The main sections of the 4th US edition are entitled:
1. Facing Dictatorships Realistically
2. The Dangers of Negotiations
3. Whence Comes the Power?
4. Dictatorships Have Weaknesses
5. Exercising Power
6. The Need for Strategic Planning
7. Planning Strategy
8. Applying Political Defiance
9. Disintegrating the Dictatorship
10. Groundwork for Durable Democracy
Three appendices are included in the fourth US edition of FDTD:
Appendix 1. The Methods of Nonviolent Action
Appendix 2. Acknowledgements and Notes on the History of From Dictatorship to Democracy
Appendix 3. A Note About Translations and Reprinting of this Publication
For Further Reading
Appendix 3 gives a step-by-step procedure for effectively translating FDTD into other languages.

Influence
From Dictatorship to Democracy has been circulated worldwide and cited repeatedly as influencing movements such as the Arab Spring (pictured) in 2011. Sharp has stated that after FDTD was first written, "although no efforts were made to promote the publication for use in other countries, translations and distribution of the publication began to spread on their own.... We usually do not know how awareness of this publication has spread from country to country."

A CNN profile of Sharp in 2012 stated that FDTD had "spread like a virus," calling it a "viral pamphlet." The book "started life in Myanmar as incendiary advice printed on a few sheets of paper and surreptitiously exchanged by activists living under a military dictatorship." Later it "took on a life of its own... eventually, some say, inspiring the uprisings known as the Arab Spring."

The Pakistani Daily Times stated that FDTD "has had an impact on the Arabic-speaking world even though the setting is in a non-Arabic world."

The Financial Times, in discussing the prospects for dictators worldwide, described Sharp as "the Lenin of the new Gandhi-ism" stating that
What is new... is the wildfire spread of systematically non-violent insurgency. This owes a great deal to the strategic thinking of Gene Sharp, an American academic whose how-to-topple-your-tyrant manual, From Dictatorship to Democracy, is the bible of activists from Belgrade to Rangoon.

The BBC reported in 2004 that FDTD "was used practically as a textbook" in lectures attended by members of Otpor!, the Serbian resistance movement, in the year 2000.

The New York Times reported in 2011 that From Dictatorship to Democracy had been posted by the Muslim Brotherhood on its website during the 2011 Egyptian revolution.

In 2012, The New York Times noted that FDTD was "available for download in more than two dozen languages" (and provided a link), while describing Sharp as a "leading [advocate] of grass-roots democracy."

In June 2015, the Financial Times reported that the Chinese government had tried to buy language rights to FDTD:

FDTD has been reviewed in newspapers.

In 2015, 17 activistists were charged for an attempted coup d'état in Angola, and one of the proofs presented was the possession of the book FDTD.

Editions
The book was first published in 1993 in installments in Burmese and English in Khit Pyaing in
Bangkok, Thailand. In 1994, it was issued as a booklet in both languages, with the
assistance of the Committee for the Restoration of Democracy in Burma. Since that time, there have been several additional English-language editions. There have also been editions in at least 30 other languages (see table at right). The English-language editions include:
 (79 pages)
 (93 pages)
 (93 pages)
 (93 pages)
 London: Housmans Bookshop. (93 pages)
 (102 pages)
 (138 pages)
 (prepublication)

See also
 Nonviolent revolution
 Mohandas Karamchand Gandhi (1869–1948)
 Resistance to Civil Government (1849), by Henry David Thoreau

References

External links

 Source text:  From Dictatorship to Democracy, A Conceptual Framework for Liberation at archive.org: From Dictatorship to Democracy, A Conceptual Framework for Liberation
 
Short history of FDTD (from Albert Einstein Institution) Short history of FDTD (from archive.org)
 The Albert Einstein Institution
 How to Start a Revolution, documentary directed by Ruaridh Arrow

1994 non-fiction books
Nonviolence
Works by Gene Sharp